The 1939 Kilkenny Senior Hurling Championship was the 45th staging of the Kilkenny Senior Hurling Championship since its establishment by the Kilkenny County Board.

Éire Óg won the championship after a 3-07 to 3-05 defeat of Carrickshock in the final. It was their first ever championship title.

References

Kilkenny Senior Hurling Championship
Kilkenny Senior Hurling Championship